Danuta Kordaczuk-Wagner (born 2 September 1939 – 10 April 1988) was a Polish volleyball player and head coach, a member of Poland women's national volleyball team in 1956–1970, a bronze medalist of the Olympic Games Tokyo 1964, a bronze medalist of the World Championship (1956, 1962) and medalist of the European Championship (silver in 1963, bronze in 1958).

Personal life
She was born in Warszawa, Poland on September 2, 1939 - on the second day after the outbreak of World War II in Poland. On October 15, 1963, she married Hubert Wagner, volleyball player and head coach of Polish men's national volleyball team, which he led to titles of World Champions 1974 and Olympic Champions 1976. On December 13, 1965, she gave birth to their son Grzegorz, who was also volleyball player (also as setter like his parents). In 1978 she got divorced. She died on April 10, 1988, in Warszawa.

Career as player

National team
Her first medal - bronze, with Poland women's national volleyball team, she achieved at World Championship 1956 in France. Then she won bronze of European Championship 1958 held in Czechoslovakia. In 1962 she won bronze medal of World Championship, and one year later silver of European Championship 1963. In 1964 she took part in Olympic Games Tokyo 1964. She played in all five matches and Poland, including Kordaczuk, won bronze medal in the Olympic tournament. Kordaczuk was considered as one of the best setters in the world and she played on the national team 164 times.

Sporting achievements

Clubs

National championship
 1957/1958  Polish Championship, with Impel Wrocław
 1959/1960  Polish Championship, with Impel Wrocław
 1960/1961  Polish Championship, with Legia Warszawa
 1961/1962  Polish Championship, with Legia Warszawa
 1962/1963  Polish Championship, with Legia Warszawa
 1963/1964  Polish Championship, with Legia Warszawa
 1964/1965  Polish Championship, with Legia Warszawa
 1966/1967  Polish Championship, with Legia Warszawa
 1967/1968  Polish Championship, with Legia Warszawa
 1968/1969  Polish Championship, with Legia Warszawa
 1969/1970  Polish Championship, with Legia Warszawa
 1970/1971  Polish Championship, with Legia Warszawa
 1971/1972  Polish Championship, with Legia Warszawa

References

External links
 
 

1939 births
Volleyball players from Warsaw
Polish women's volleyball players
Volleyball players at the 1964 Summer Olympics
Olympic volleyball players of Poland
Olympic medalists in volleyball
Olympic bronze medalists for Poland
1988 deaths
Medalists at the 1964 Summer Olympics